

39001–39100 

|-bgcolor=#f2f2f2
| colspan=4 align=center | 
|}

39101–39200 

|-id=167
| 39167 Opitom ||  || Cyrielle Opitom (born 1989) is a postdoctoral fellow at the University of Edinburgh who is an expert in comet observations, including measuring the isotopic ratios in cometary comae. || 
|-id=184
| 39184 Willgrundy ||  || William ("Will") M. Grundy, astronomer at Lowell Observatory || 
|}

39201–39300 

|-id=256
| 39256 Zacny ||  || Kris Zacny (born 1973) is a leader in the development of robotic drilling and sample handling hardware for a variety of planetary missions and in-situ resource utilization applications. || 
|-id=285
| 39285 Kipkeino ||  || Kipchoge Keino (born 1940) won the 1500-m event at the 1968 Olympics by a record-setting margin of 20 meters. His running career spanned 1962 to 1973. After retiring, he and his wife, Phyllis, worked to educate and care for orphans in Kenya. In 2016 he was awarded the first Olympic Laurel for education, culture, development and peace through sport. || 
|-id=290
| 39290 Landsman ||  || Zoe Landsman (born 1987) is a lecturer at the University of Central Florida, specializing in observations and modeling of asteroids and other airless bodies, particularly M-types and low albedo asteroid families. She is also a committed educator and actively engages in public outreach. || 
|-id=300
| 39300 Auyeungsungfan ||  || Auyeungsungfan (born 1959) spent 20 years as a school principal. || 
|}

39301–39400 

|-id=314
| 39314 Moritakumi ||  || Takumi Mori (1936–2015) worked in the Japan Coast Guard for many years, undertaking research in positional astronomy and geodetic observations. He also made efforts towards the establishment of the Kansai Branch of the Japan Spaceguard Association. || 
|-id=332
| 39332 Lauwaiming ||  || Lau Wai Ming (born 1960), a School principal as well as a committed and passionate educator who firmly believes in the value of knowledge. He has served in the education field for 38 years and has inspired and touch the hearts of many teachers and students. || 
|-id=335
| 39335 Caccin ||  || Bruno Caccin (born 1944), an Italian astronomer who worked at Capodimonte Observatory in Naples for 15 years. In 1986 he became professor in astronomy at the University of Rome, Tor Vergata. || 
|-id=336
| 39336 Mariacapria ||  || Maria Teresa Capria, an Italian astronomer and researcher at IASF-CNR in Rome. || 
|-id=382
| 39382 Opportunity || 2696 P-L || The Opportunity rover is one of NASA's successful 2004 Mars Exploration Rovers. It explored rock layers in the walls of craters at Meridiani Planum. || 
|}

39401–39500 

|-id=405
| 39405 Mosigkau || 1063 T-1 || Mosigkau castle, near Dessau, Germany, a relic of the Rococo period, built between 1752 and 1757 as a summer residence for Princess Anna Wilhelmine von Anhalt-Dessau || 
|-id=415
| 39415 Janeausten || 4231 T-1 || Jane Austen, English novelist || 
|-id=420
| 39420 Elizabethgaskell || 2084 T-2 || Elizabeth Gaskell (1810–1865) was a 19th-century English novelist, best known for her 1853 novel Cranford. || 
|-id=427
| 39427 Charlottebrontë || 3360 T-2 || Charlotte Brontë, English novelist and poet, best known for Jane Eyre || 
|-id=428
| 39428 Emilybrontë || 4169 T-2 || Emily Brontë, English novelist and poet, who wrote only one novel, Wuthering Heights || 
|-id=429
| 39429 Annebrontë || 4223 T-2 || Anne Brontë, English novelist and poet, best known for The Tenant of Wildfell Hall || 
|-id=463
| 39463 Phyleus || 1973 SZ || Phyleus, son of King Augeas of Elis, and father of Meges, who led the contingent from Dulichium to the Trojan War || 
|-id=464
| 39464 Pöppelmann ||  || Matthäus Daniel Pöppelmann (1662–1736) , a German architect || 
|}

39501–39600 

|-id=509
| 39509 Kardashev ||  || Nikolai Kardashev (1932–2019), director of the Astrospace Center of the Lebedev Physical Institute. || 
|-id=516
| 39516 Lusigny || 1987 OO || Lusigny (sur Barse) is a small French village near the Lac dOrient in Aube. || 
|-id=529
| 39529 Vatnajökull ||  || Vatnajökull (Glacier of Lakes), the largest glacier in Iceland. || 
|-id=536
| 39536 Lenhof ||  || Helmut Lenhof (1924–), a retired professor of physics. He was one of the founders of the Carinthian Astronomical Association in Klagenfurt, Austria. || 
|-id=539
| 39539 Emmadesmet ||  || Emma de Smet (born 2005), a granddaughter of Belgian astronomer Eric Walter Elst who discovered this minor planet. || 
|-id=540
| 39540 Borchert ||  || Wolfgang Borchert (1921–1947), German poet and writer || 
|-id=543
| 39543 Aubriet ||  || Claude Aubriet (c. 1651–1742), French painter || 
|-id=549
| 39549 Casals ||  || Pablo Casals (1876–1973), Spanish (Catalan)-American cellist, composer and conductor || 
|-id=557
| 39557 Gielgud || 1992 JG || John Gielgud (1904–2000), British actor || 
|-id=558
| 39558 Kishine || 1992 KC || Junichiro Kishine (born 1967), Japanese theoretical physicist and amateur astronomer. He is an expert in condensed matter physics. || 
|-id=564
| 39564 Tarsia ||  || Rodrigo Dias Tarsia (born 1946), a Brazilian astrophysicist and retired professor at the Federal University in Belo Horizonte || 
|-id=566
| 39566 Carllewis ||  || Carl Lewis (born 1961), an American track and field athlete who won nine Olympic gold medals || 
|-id=571
| 39571 Pückler ||  || Hermann, Fürst von Pückler-Muskau (1785–1871), German landscaper and writer || 
|}

39601–39700 

|-id=635
| 39635 Kusatao || 1994 YL || Kusatao Nakamura, Chinese-born Japanese Haiku poet || 
|-id=645
| 39645 Davelharris ||  || David Lowell Harris, 20th-century American astronomer, member of the "pre-LINEAR" observing team at Socorro during 1995–1996 || 
|-id=653
| 39653 Carnera || 1995 UC || Luigi Carnera (1875–1962) began his career as Max Wolf's assistant at the Heidelberg Observatory, Germany, where he discovered sixteen new asteroids in 1901/02. Later, he taught astronomy in Genoa and was director of Trieste and Naples Observatories. || 
|-id=655
| 39655 Muneharuasada ||  || Muneharu Asada (born 1961), a member of the Yamagata Astronomical Society. || 
|-id=677
| 39677 Anagaribaldi || 1996 EG || Ana Maria de Jesus Ribeiro da Silva di Garibaldi (Anita Garibaldi), Brazilian-born heroine of the Italian resurgence and wife of Giuseppe Garibaldi || 
|-id=678
| 39678 Ammannito ||  || Eleonora Ammannito, Italian astronomer and space scientist || 
|-id=679
| 39679 Nukuhiyama ||  || Nukuhiyama, a mountain which is located in the west of the discoverer's home town, Shirataka, Yamagata prefecture. || 
|-id=686
| 39686 Takeshihara ||  || Takeshi Hara, a member of the Yamagata Astronomical Society in 2009 and actively popularizes astronomy. || 
|-id=699
| 39699 Ernestocorte ||  || Ernesto Corte, American entrepreneur, founder of Gamma-Metrics, pioneer in the application of radiation physics to elemental analysis of materials || 
|}

39701–39800 

|-id=712
| 39712 Ehimedaigaku ||  || Ehime University (Ehime Daigaku) is a Japanese national university. Its Research Center for Space and Cosmic Evolution has conducted various deep surveys of the universe and has discovered very high-redshift galaxies || 
|-id=726
| 39726 Hideyukitezuka ||  || Hideyuki Tezuka (born 1955) a Japanese amateur astronomer who became a member of the Nanyo Astronomical Lovers Club in 1986 and actively popularizes astronomy. || 
|-id=734
| 39734 Marchiori ||  || Gianpietro Marchiori (born 1953) is the founder of EIE Group, an Italian company that has been involved in the construction of optical and radio telescopes around the world. || 
|-id=741
| 39741 Komm ||  || Rudolf Walter Komm (born 1957) is an American helioseismologist who has contributed substantially to the study of solar activity. His studies include tracing the movements of active regions, measuring fluctuations in solar oscillations and determining flows in granulation. Komm has also developed several innovative methods of time-series analysis. || 
|-id=748
| 39748 Guccini ||  || Francesco Guccini (born 1940) is an Italian folk composer and singer, very famous for his popular songs. || 
|-id=791
| 39791 Jameshesser ||  || James E. Hesser is a Canadian astronomer, acting director of the Herzberg Institute of Astrophysics and 1997 recipient of the Michael Smith Award for Science Promotion. He has contributed to the study of atomic and molecular spectroscopy, rapidly varying degenerate stars, stellar populations and chemical evolution in the Milky Way and nearby galaxies (Src). || 
|-id=792
| 39792 Patrickchevalley ||  || Patrick Chevalley (born 1958), a Swiss amateur astronomer and computer engineer, who is the author of the "Cartes du Ciel" planetarium and "CCDciel" image acquisition freeware, and co-author of the "Virtual Moon Atlas" freeware. || 
|-id=795
| 39795 Marson ||  || Roberto Marson (1944–2011) was a multi-sport athlete who competed in four Paralympics from 1964 to 1976 winning a total of 26 medals. He was named Outstanding Athlete at the 1968 games after winning ten gold medals. He was added to the International Paralympian Hall of Fame in 2012. || 
|-id=799
| 39799 Hadano ||  || The Japanese city of Hadano in Kanagawa Prefecture is where the Hadano Observatory  is located. The city was famous for its tobacco production, and is now noted for its fresh springs. Hadano is situated at the foot of the Tanzawa mountains in an area of great natural beauty. || 
|}

39801–39900 

|-id=802
| 39802 Ivanhlinka ||  || Ivan Hlinka (1950–2004) was one of the biggest legends in the history of Czech ice hockey. He won gold medals at the World Championships in 1972, 1976 and 1977. As a coach, he won gold medals at the Olympic Games in 1998 and at the World Championship in 1999. He was a member of the IIHF Hall of Fame from 2002. || 
|-id=809
| 39809 Fukuchan ||  || Fukuchan, cartoon character created by Ryuichi Yokoyama || 
|-id=814
| 39814 Christianlegrand ||  || Christian Legrand (born 1953), a French amateur astronomer and public service engineer, who is a co-author of the "Virtual Moon Atlas" freeware and the author of books and articles about the Moon. || 
|-id=849
| 39849 Giampieri ||  || Giuliano Giampieri, friend of the first discoverer || 
|-id=854
| 39854 Gabriopiola ||  || Gabrio Piola (1794–1850), an Italian mathematician and physicist, known for his treatises on mechanics. The Piola–Kirchhoff stress tensor and Piola transformation are named after him. || 
|-id=860
| 39860 Aiguoxiang ||  || Ai Guoxiang (born 1938) is a solar astrophysicist, an Academician of the Chinese Academy of Sciences (CAS), and an Academician of TWAS. He was the first Director General of the National Astronomical Observatories, CAS, and served as Vice-President and President of IAU Commission 10 from 1994–2000. || 
|-id=864
| 39864 Poggiali ||  || Maurizio Poggiali, poet, aircraft navigator and aerospace engineer || 
|-id=871
| 39871 Lucagrazzini ||  || Luca Grazzini (born 1974), an Italian amateur astronomer and member of the astrometry team at Beppe Forti Astronomical Observatory  in Montelupo Fiorentino, Tuscany. || 
|-id=875
| 39875 Matteolombardo ||  || Matteo Lombardo (born 1964), an Italian amateur astronomer and member of the astrometry team at Beppe Forti Astronomical Observatory  in Montelupo Fiorentino, Tuscany. || 
|-id=877
| 39877 Deverchére ||  || Philippe Deverchére (born 1959), a French amateur astronomer and engineer, who has developed the "C2A" and light-pollution analysis freeware and instrumentation. || 
|-id=880
| 39880 Dobšinský ||  || Pavol Emanuel Dobšinský (1828–1885), a Lutheran pastor, folklorist, literary historian, editor and translator || 
|-id=882
| 39882 Edgarmitchell ||  || Edgar Mitchell (1930–2016), an American naval officer, aviator and NASA astronaut, who was the sixth man to walk on the Moon. || 
|-id=890
| 39890 Bobstephens ||  || Robert Stephens (born 1955) is an American amateur astronomer from California who has determined some 30 sets of minor-planet lightcurve parameters since becoming active in the field in 1999. His high-quality work and generosity in sharing his time and knowledge within the amateur community have set a standard for others to follow. || 
|}

39901–40000 

|-id=930
| 39930 Kalauch ||  || Klaus-Dieter Kalauch (born 1958), a German amateur astronomer and teacher of astronomy, understood how to inspire his friends with the beauty of the sky. Without his influence, Gerhard Lehmann, who discovered this object, would never have become interested in observing minor planets. || 
|-id=971
| 39971 József ||  || Attila József (1905–1937), one of the greatest Hungarian poets of the 20th century, spent his entire life in extreme poverty and suffered from depression. He was a prodigy, making his debut at the age of 17 with his first collection of poems. During his short and rhapsodic career, an amazing oeuvre emerged. || 
|-id=991
| 39991 Iochroma ||  || Iochroma, a genus of shrubs and small trees found in the forests of South America. Their hummingbird-pollinated flowers are tubular or trumpet-shaped. Iochromas are often cultivated as flowering ornamentals. || 
|}

References 

039001-040000